Adrienne Dore (born Elizabeth Himmelsbach; May 22, 1907 – November 26, 1992) was an American actress, model, and beauty pageant winner. She was first runner-up in the Miss America 1925 pageant, competing as Miss Los Angeles. Dore went on to have a modest career in motion pictures before retiring in 1934.

Early life

Adrienne Dore was born Elizabeth Himmelsbach in Coeur d'Alene, Idaho, to Louis Joseph Himmelsbach and Edith Estelle Kell. The family moved to Yakima and then Seattle, Washington, where she attended school at a convent. She performed in her first musical there at age three. Her education at Forrest Ridge Convent was in general studies but she focused on dancing and the theater.

Career 

Dore moved to New York City, and pursued a career in acting under the name Adrienne Doré. She was a singer in the musical revue "Elliott, Comstock, and Gest", performing at the Cocoanut Grove, a nightclub located on the roof of the Century Theatre. She competed in the Miss Los Angeles Beauty contest in 1925, winning, and went on to the Miss America pageant, placing second in the competition. The contestants signed promissory contracts for film appearances with the Famous Players-Lasky Corporation upon winning; Dore's was with Universal Pictures for 5 years.

Dore returned to Los Angeles where she began acting in uncredited roles in silent pictures and two reelers such as Johnny's Week End and Adam's Eve, before moving on to full feature talkies. First receiving top billing in minor pictures like Beyond London Lights (1928), then continuing with minor roles alongside such stars as Clara Bow in The Wild Party (1929). In 1931, she obtained a contract with Warner Bros., and had supporting roles in Union Depot (1932) and The Rich Are Always with Us (1932) with Bette Davis. She met and married independent or B film producer Burt Kelly, who, along with Sam Bischoff and William Saal, headed KBS productions. Dore's last role was in Undercover Men, a 1934 Kelly film.

Later life
Dore and Kelly remained married until his death in 1983. Dore died at the age of 85 and is buried in an unmarked grave in Chippewa Falls, Wisconsin.

Filmography

References

Bibliography
 Mayne, Judith. Directed by Dorothy Arzner. Indiana University Press, 1994.

External links

1907 births
1992 deaths
American film actresses
20th-century American actresses